In mathematics, Eichler cohomology (also called parabolic cohomology or cuspidal cohomology) is a cohomology theory for Fuchsian groups, introduced by , that is a variation of group cohomology analogous to the image of the cohomology with compact support in the ordinary cohomology group. There is also a variation of the Eichler–Shimura isomorphisms using l-adic cohomology instead of real cohomology, which relates the coefficients of cusp forms to eigenvalues of Frobenius acting on these groups.   used this to reduce the Ramanujan conjecture to the Weil conjectures that he later proved.

Eichler cohomology

If G is a Fuchsian group and M is a representation of it then the Eichler cohomology group H(G,M) is defined to be the kernel of the map from H(G,M) to 
Πc H(Gc,M), where the product is over the cusps c of a fundamental domain of G, and Gc is the subgroup fixing the cusp c.

References

Modular forms